Cairnsmore of Carsphairn is a hill in the Carsphairn and Scaur Hills range, part of the Southern Uplands of Scotland. An alternative name, rarely used nowadays, is Cairnsmore of Deugh.

Walking
The usual route of ascent is from the A713 road to the west at the "Green Well of Scotland" a mile north of Carsphairn. Despite its height, it is a relatively easy hill to climb - over some rough grass, with no steep slopes and with a very flat summit area - though there are areas of more rugged ground on the outlying peaks of Beninner and Moorbrock.  For most of the route, there are excellent views westward over the Glenkens to the Rhinns of Kells in the Galloway Hills. According to a tourist information board placed at The Green Well at the start of the track, in good conditions, the mountains of England, Wales, Ireland and the Highlands of Scotland can be seen from the summit, as well as Glasgow and Edinburgh, some 80 miles distant.

Climbing
Because of the local geology, no good rock climbing has been recorded on the massif.

Subsidiary SMC Summits

References

External links
 Information on Hill Walking in the Galloway Hills

Marilyns of Scotland
Donald mountains
Corbetts
Mountains and hills of the Southern Uplands
Mountains and hills of Dumfries and Galloway
Climbing areas of Scotland